Edison Hurtado (born 25 July 1972) is a Colombian wrestler. He competed in the men's freestyle 69 kg at the 2000 Summer Olympics.

References

External links
 

1972 births
Living people
Colombian male sport wrestlers
Olympic wrestlers of Colombia
Wrestlers at the 2000 Summer Olympics
People from Tumaco
Pan American Games medalists in wrestling
Pan American Games silver medalists for Colombia
Wrestlers at the 2003 Pan American Games
Wrestlers at the 2007 Pan American Games
Medalists at the 2003 Pan American Games
Medalists at the 2007 Pan American Games
Sportspeople from Nariño Department
20th-century Colombian people
21st-century Colombian people